Pudu may refer to:

Pudú, a type of small deer
Pudu, Kuala Lumpur, a town in Malaysia
Pudu, Dakshina Kannada, a town in India
Pudu River, a river in China

See also